Antillesoma is a genus of peanut worms (Phylum Sipuncula). The genus belongs to the family Phascolosomatidae. Antillesoma was described in 1973 by Stephen and Edmonds.

Species
The following species are recognised:
 Antillesoma antillarum (Grube, 1858)
Antillesoma mexicanum Silva-Morales, López-Aquino, Islas-Villanueva, Ruiz-Escobar & Bastida-Zavala, 2019

References

External links

Sipunculans
Monotypic protostome genera